Charles Clark Sholes (January 8, 1816 – October 5, 1867) was a Wisconsin politician and newspaperman. He was the 8th Speaker of the Wisconsin State Assembly and 2nd Mayor of Kenosha, Wisconsin.  He also served in the Wisconsin State Senate. His younger brother was Christopher Latham Sholes, the inventor of the typewriter.

Biography

Born in Norwich, Connecticut, to Orrin and Catherine Sholes, he worked for a time in Pennsylvania and learned printing.  In 1836, he moved to Green Bay, in the Wisconsin Territory and published his own paper, the Green Bay Wisconsin Democrat.  He was also a publisher of the first newspaper in Madison, the Wisconsin Enquirer.  While in Green Bay, he first entered politics, serving as a Democrat in the lower chamber of the Wisconsin Territorial Assembly during the first and second sessions (1837-1840).

In 1840, he moved his plant and paper to Kenosha, then known as "Southport", and renamed the paper the Telegraph.  In Kenosha, his brother Christopher Latham Sholes managed the paper, and eventually purchased the business from Charles.

In 1843, he foreclosed a lien on the Wisconsin Enquirer and moved that company to Milwaukee, where the paper was renamed the Milwaukee Democrat.  That same year, however, Sholes stopped production of that paper and began publishing a new paper called the American Freeman, affiliated with the abolitionist Liberty Party.  Sholes was managing editor of that paper until 1846.

In 1847, Sholes returned to Kenosha and made his home there.  He was elected Mayor of Kenosha, serving from 1852 to 1856.  And was elected as a Republican to represent Kenosha in the Wisconsin State Assembly for 1855, he was also chosen as Speaker of the Assembly that year.  Later that year, he was the Republican nominee for Lieutenant Governor of Wisconsin, but was defeated by Democrat Arthur MacArthur, Sr., who went on to briefly serve as Governor due to a controversy over election fraud in the gubernatorial election.

Along with Zalmon G. Simmons, he was the founder of the Wisconsin State Telegraph Company, and in 1855 he became president of that company.

Sholes returned to politics one more time in 1865, earning election to the Wisconsin State Senate on the National Union Party ticket for the 1866 and 1867 sessions.

He died in 1867, after the legislative session was over, but before the official expiration of his term as Senator.

He was married to Sarah Elizabeth McKinney.  Together they had nine children, though only three lived to adulthood.

Notes

External links

1816 births
1867 deaths
Politicians from Norwich, Connecticut
Mayors of Kenosha, Wisconsin
Members of the Wisconsin State Assembly
Wisconsin state senators
Editors of Wisconsin newspapers
Journalists from Wisconsin
19th-century American newspaper founders
19th-century American journalists
American male journalists
19th-century American male writers
19th-century American politicians
Speakers of the Wisconsin State Assembly
Members of the Wisconsin Territorial Legislature